Exhaust pulse pressure charging (EPPC) is a system for supercharging two-stroke diesel engines of the loop-scavenge type.  Loop-scavenge engines cannot be pressure-charged in the same way as uniflow engines or four-stroke engines because the inlet and exhaust ports are open at the same time.

Overview
The engine usually has a Roots blower to provide air for scavenging and this is arranged to deliver excess air so that  air follows the exhaust gases into the exhaust manifold.  Some of this air is then forced back into the cylinder by a rise in pressure in the exhaust manifold resulting from the exhaust pulse from another cylinder.

For additional pressure charging a turbocharger may be fitted, in series with the Roots blower, but a turbocharger cannot be used alone because it would not provide enough air for scavenging at low speeds.

Exhaust Pulse Pressure Charging Advantages and Disadvantages 
Pulse pressure charging is much more effective with a low load and at low speed than traditional supercharging since the exhaust is coming from engine cylinders instead of the engine as a whole. Pulse pressure charging remains efficient even when the break mean effective pressure (BMEP) is below 8 bar. Additionally, the exhaust pipes used in pulse pressure charging have a smaller diameter, so the pressure in the system builds much faster. Pulse pressure charging does not require an auxiliary scavenger pump and blower as the load on the motor changes and it provides a lot of energy available at the turbine, allowing for good supercharger acceleration.

However, since the exhaust comes in pulses from the cylinders, the exhaust piping is much more complicated in a pulse pressure system because it is dependent on the number of cylinders and their firing order. In some cases, exhaust pipes must be different sizes to keep the overall pressure as consistent as possible. Finally, high pressure exhaust from one cylinder can occasionally pass back into another cylinder during its scavenging period while it is at low pressure which has a negative impact on the efficiency of the combustion in the cylinder.

Applications 
Exhaust pulse pressure charging is generally used in very large machines with auxiliary diesel engines, such generators. In large pieces of machinery, such as boats and locomotives, the main engine tends to be under a high and constant load meaning a constant pressure charging system is much more efficient. An auxiliary engine, such as a generator, is much more likely to experience variation in load so exhaust pulse pressure charging is more efficient. Additionally, since pulse pressure charging remains efficient even at low break mean effective pressure, an auxiliary engine with pulse pressure charging is capable of producing a large amount of power even when the full capability of the engine is not being utilized.

Examples
Exhaust pulse pressure charging was used by Crossley in these diesel locomotive engines:
 the HST-Vee 8, used in the British Rail Class 28, the CIE 001 Class and the WAGR X class
 the EST-Vee 8 used in the CIE 201 Class
 the ESNT 6 used in British Rail Class D3/3 shunting locomotives

See also
 Backpressure
 Inertial supercharging effect
 Kadenacy effect
 Pressure wave supercharger

References

Sources
 The Diesel Locomotive by R. L. Aston, published by Thames and Hudson, London, 1957, pp 19, 22–24, 31

Superchargers
Two-stroke diesel engines
Exhaust systems